The First XI (or, less commonly, First 11) are the eleven primary players in an organisation's leading team, particularly a football or cricket team. A player who is considered a core part of the starting line-up in a First XI team is often the most proficient in his/her particular position; for example, a football club's leading goal-scorer will almost always be selected due to their ability and the contribution he/she makes to the team.

'First eleven' is a reference to the fact that they are the first eleven players selected to play for the team—many sports state that clubs must have squads of no fewer than  number of players, and this number is often higher than 11. For example, in the Premier League, each club has to designate a squad of 25.

See also 
 Starting lineup

Cricket terminology
Association football terminology